Dalcerides chirma is a moth in the family Dalceridae. It was described by Schaus in 1920. It is found in southern Mexico and Guatemala. The habitat consists of tropical moist and subtropical wet forests.

References

Moths described in 1920
Dalceridae